This article provides information on candidates who stood for the 1937 Australian federal election. The election was held on 23 October 1937.

In 1936, the Lang Labor group had been reabsorbed into the Australian Labor Party. Seats are still designated as being held by Lang Labor.

By-elections, appointments and defections

By-elections and appointments
On 1 June 1935, David Oliver Watkins (Labor) was elected to succeed his father David Watkins (Labor) as the member for Newcastle.
On 17 August 1935, Harold Holt (UAP) was elected to succeed George Maxwell (UAP) as the member for Fawkner.
On 26 September 1935, Guy Arkins (UAP) was appointed a New South Wales Senator to replace Lionel Courtenay (UAP).
On 19 August 1936, Thomas Marwick (Country) was appointed a Western Australian Senator replace William Carroll (Country).
On 12 December 1936, Bill Riordan (Labor) was elected to succeed Darby Riordan (Labor) as the member for Kennedy.
On 19 December 1936, Arthur Fadden (Country) was elected to succeed Sir Littleton Groom (UAP) as the member for Darling Downs.
On 8 May 1937, William Scully (Labor) was elected to succeed Aubrey Abbott (Country) as the member for Gwydir.
On 2 September 1937, Ben Courtice (Labor) was appointed a Queensland Senator to replace John MacDonald (Labor).
On 21 October 1937, Philip McBride (UAP) was appointed a South Australian Senator to replace Oliver Badman (Country).

Defections
In 1936, the Australian Labor Party (NSW) was reabsorbed into the Australian Labor Party. NSW Labor members rejoined the federal party: Jack Beasley (West Sydney), Joe Clark (Darling), Joe Gander (Reid), Jock Garden (Cook), Rowley James (Hunter), Bert Lazzarini (Werriwa), Dan Mulcahy (Lang), Sol Rosevear (Dalley) and Eddie Ward (East Sydney).

Redistributions and seat changes
Redistributions of electoral boundaries occurred in Victoria and Western Australia.
In Victoria, the Country-held seat of Echuca was abolished. A new seat, Deakin (notionally UAP), was created.
The member for Echuca, John McEwen (Country), contested Indi.
The member for Indi, William Hutchinson (UAP), contested Deakin.
There were minimal changes in Western Australia.
The member for Lilley (Qld), Sir Donald Cameron (UAP), contested the Senate.
South Australian Senator Oliver Badman (Country) resigned from the Senate to contest Grey, as part of a Coalition deal that saw Philip McBride (UAP), the member for Grey, appointed to Badman's vacancy in the Senate.

Retiring Members and Senators

Labor
 Jock Garden MP (Cook, NSW)

United Australia
 Archibald Fisken MP (Ballaarat, Vic)
 Eric Harrison MP (Bendigo, Vic)
Senator Charles Cox (NSW)
Senator Jack Duncan-Hughes (SA)
Senator Sir Walter Massy-Greene (NSW)

House of Representatives
Sitting members at the time of the election are shown in bold text. Successful candidates are highlighted in the relevant colour. Where there is possible confusion, an asterisk (*) is also used.

New South Wales

Northern Territory

Queensland

South Australia

Tasmania

Victoria

Western Australia

Senate
Sitting Senators are shown in bold text.

New South Wales
Four seats were up for election. One of these was a short-term vacancy caused by United Australia Party Senator Lionel Courtenay's death; this had been filled in the interim by Guy Arkins. The United Australia Party-Country Party Coalition was defending four seats. United Australia Party Senator Dick Dein and Country Party Senator Mac Abbott were not up for re-election.

Queensland
Three seats were up for election. The Labor Party was defending three seats. United Australia Party Senators Thomas Crawford and Harry Foll and Country Party Senator Walter Cooper were not up for re-election.

South Australia
Three seats were up for election. The United Australia Party was defending three seats. United Australia Party Senators James McLachlan, George McLeay and Oliver Uppill were not up for re-election.

Tasmania
Three seats were up for election. The United Australia Party was defending three seats. United Australia Party Senators Charles Grant, John Hayes and Herbert Hays were not up for re-election.

Victoria
Three seats were up for election. The United Australia Party was defending three seats. United Australia Party Senators Charles Brand and John Leckie and Country Party Senator William Gibson were not up for re-election.

Western Australia
Three seats were up for election. The United Australia Party-Country Party Coalition was defending three seats. United Australia Party Senators Herbert Collett and Allan MacDonald and Country Party Senator Bertie Johnston were not up for re-election.

See also
 1937 Australian federal election
 Members of the Australian House of Representatives, 1934–1937
 Members of the Australian House of Representatives, 1937–1940
 Members of the Australian Senate, 1935–1938
 Members of the Australian Senate, 1938–1941
 List of political parties in Australia

References
Adam Carr's Election Archive - House of Representatives 1937
Adam Carr's Election Archive - Senate 1937

1937 in Australia
Candidates for Australian federal elections